Jajpur  is a district of Odisha state in eastern India. The Odisha Government carried out a re-organisation of districts of Odisha in 1993. The erstwhile Cuttack district was split into multiple districts with Jajpur being one of them. The district came into being on 1 April 1993.

Geography 
Jajpur is located in eastern Odisha. It borders Kendujhar and Bhadrak districts to the northeast, Kendrapara and Cuttack districts to the south and Dhenkanal district to the west. The district is located on the Odisha coastal plain, with the southern part lying in the Mahanadi River Delta. To the north there are some small discontinuous hill ranges. Some of the major rivers in the district are the Brahmani and Baitarani on the eastern edge.

Demographics

According to the 2011 census Jajpur district has a population of 1,827,192, roughly equal to the nation of Kosovo or the US state of Nebraska. This gives it a ranking of 261st in India (out of a total of 640). Its population growth rate over the decade 2001–2011 was 12.43%. Jajpur has a sex ratio of 972 females for every 1000 males, and a literacy rate of 80.44%. Scheduled Castes and Scheduled Tribes made up 23.72% and 8.29% of the population respectively.

At the time of the 2011 Census of India, 90.27% of the population in the district spoke Odia, 4.79% Urdu and 2.09% Ho as their first language.

Administrative Divisions 
The district is divided into 10 revenue Tehsils as below.

 Jajpur	
 Dasarathapur
 Binjharpur
 Bari	
 Rasulpur
 Dharmasala	
 Darpan	
 Vyasanagar
 Danagadi
 Sukinda

The district consists of 1 subdivision Jajpur. It also consists of 10 blocks.

 Jajpur 
 Binjharpur 
 Bari
 Dasarathapur 
 Rasulpur 
 Dharmasala	 
 Barchana
 Korei	 
 Danagadi 
 Sukinda

The district has 331 Gram Panchayats and 1781 Villages.

The district has 2 municipalities Byasanagar and Jajpur , with the later serving as the district headquarters.

Villages
Neulpur

Politics
The district consists of one Parliamentary constituency Jajpur. This is currently represented by Sarmistha Sethi of Biju Janata Dal.

Vidhan Sabha Constituencies

The following are the 7 Vidhan sabha constituencies of Jajpur district along with their elected members.

Colleges
 N.C. Autonomous College, Jajpur Town
 Vyasanagar Autonomous College, Vyasanagar, Jajpur
 S G College, Kanikapada, Jajpur

References

External links

 
 Non-Govt Web Portal Of Jajpur District 

 
Districts of Odisha